The discography of Dean Lewis, an Australian singer, consists of two studio albums, one EPs and twelve singles.

Studio albums

Extended plays

Singles

Notes

Other charted and certified songs

Music videos

References

Discographies of Australian artists
Pop music discographies
Rhythm and blues discographies